The  (Devanagari अष्टाध्यायी) is a grammar that describes a form of an early Indo-Aryan language: Sanskrit. 

Authored by Sanskrit philologist and scholar Pāṇini and dated to around 500 BCE, it describes the language as current in his time, specifically the dialect and register of an élite of model speakers, referred to by Pāṇini himself as śiṣṭa. The work also accounts both for some features specific to the older Vedic form of the language, as well as certain dialectal features current in the author's time. 

The Aṣṭādhyāyī employs a derivational system to describe the language, where real speech is derived from posited abstract utterances formed by means of affixes added to bases under certain conditions. 

The Aṣṭādhyāyī is supplemented by three ancillary texts: akṣarasamāmnāya, dhātupāṭha and gaṇapāṭha.

Etymology

Aṣṭādhyāyī is made of two words aṣṭa-, 'eight' and adhyāya-, 'chapter', thus meaning eight-chaptered, or 'the book of eight chapters'.

Background

Grammatical tradition
By 1000 BCE, a large body of hymns composed in the oldest attested form of the Proto-Indo-Aryan language had been consolidated into the Rigveda, which formed the canonical basis of the Vedic religion, being transmitted from generation to generation entirely orally. 

In the course of the following centuries, as the popular speech evolved, growing concern among the guardians of the Vedic religion that the hymns be passed on without 'corruption' led to the rise of a vigorous, sophisticated grammatical tradition involving the study of linguistic analysis, in particular phonetics alongside grammar. The high point of this centuries-long endeavour was Pāṇini's Aṣṭādhyāyī, which eclipsed all others before him.

While not the first, the Aṣṭādhyāyī is the oldest linguistic and grammar text, and one of the oldest Sanskrit texts, surviving in its entirety. Pāṇini refers to older texts such as the Unādisūtra, Dhātupāṭha, and Gaṇapātha but some of these have only survived in part.

Arrangement

The Aṣṭādhyāyī consists of 3,959 sūtras in eight chapters, which are each subdivided into four sections or pādas. There are different types of sūtras, with the vidhisūtra - operational rules, being the main one. The other, ancillary sūtras, are:

 paribhāṣā - metarules
 adhikāra - headings
 atideśa·sūtra - extension rules
 niyama·sūtra - restrictive rules
 pratiṣedha- & niṣedha·sūtra - negation rules

Related fields

The Aṣṭādhyāyī is the foundation of Vyākaraṇa, one of the Vedic ancillary fields (Vedāṅgas), and complements others such as the Niruktas, Nighaṇṭus, and Śikṣā. Regarded as extremely compact without sacrificing completeness, it would become the model for later specialist technical texts or sūtras.

Method

The text takes material from lexical lists (dhātupāṭha, gaṇapātha) as input and describes algorithms to be applied to them for the generation of well-formed words. It is highly systematised and technical. Inherent in its approach are the concepts of the phoneme, the morpheme and the root. A consequence of his grammar's focus on brevity is its highly unintuitive structure, reminiscent of modern notations such as the "Backus–Naur form". His sophisticated logical rules and technique have been widely influential in ancient and modern linguistics.

Pāṇini makes use of a technical metalanguage consisting of a syntax, morphology, and lexicon. This metalanguage is organised according to a series of meta-rules, some of which are explicitly stated while others can be deduced.

Commentarial tradition

The Aṣṭādhyāyī, composed in an era when oral composition and transmission was the norm, is staunchly embedded in that oral tradition. In order to ensure wide dissemination, Pāṇini is said to have preferred brevity over clarity - it can be recited end-to-end in two hours. This has led to the emergence of a great number of commentaries of his work over the centuries, which for the most part adhere to the foundations laid by Pāṇini's work.

The most famous and among the most ancient of these Bhāṣyas is the Mahābhāṣya of Patañjali. Non-Hindu texts and traditions on grammar emerged after Patañjali, some of which include the Sanskrit grammar text of Jainendra of Jainism and the Chandra school of Buddhism.

Critical responses

Pāṇini's grammar, according to Renou and Filliozat, defines the linguistic expression and a classic that set the standard for Sanskrit language.

Rules

The first two sutras are as follows:
1.1.1 vṛddhir ādaiC 
1.1.2 adeṄ guṇaḥ 
In these sutras, the letters which here are put into the upper case actually are special meta-linguistic symbols; they are called IT  markers or, by later writers such as Katyayana and Patanjali, anubandhas (see below). The  C and Ṅ refer to Shiva Sutras 4 ("ai, au, C") and 3 ("e, o, Ṅ"), respectively, forming what are known as the pratyāhāras "comprehensive designations" aiC, eṄ. They denote the list of phonemes {ai, au} and {e, o} respectively. The T  appearing (in its variant form /d/) in both sutras is also an IT marker: Sutra 1.1.70 defines it as indicating that the preceding phoneme does not represent a list, but a single phoneme, encompassing all supra-segmental features such as accent and nasality. For further example, āT and aT represent ā and a respectively.

When a sutra defines the technical term, the term defined comes at the end, so the first sutra should have properly been ādaiJ vṛddhir instead of vṛddhir ādaiC. However the orders are reversed to have a good-luck word at the very beginning of the work; vṛddhir happens to mean 'prosperity' in its non-technical use.

Thus the two sūtras consist of a list of phonemes, followed by a technical term; the final interpretation of the two sūtras above is thus:
1.1.1: {ā, ai, au} are called .
1.1.2: {a, e, o} are called guṇa.
At this point, one can see they are definitions of terminology: guṇa and vṛ́ddhi are the terms for the full and the lengthened Indo-European ablaut grades, respectively.

List of IT markers 
Markers called it or anubandha are defined in P. 1.3.2 through P. 1.3.8. As these anubandhas are metalinguistic markers and not pronounced in the final derived form, pada (word), they are elided by P. 1.3.9  – 'There is elision of that (i.e. any of the preceding items which have been defined as an it).' Accordingly, Pāṇini defines the anubandhas as follows:

 Nasalized vowels, e.g. bhañjO. Cf. P. 1.3.2.
 A final consonant (haL). Cf. P. 1.3.3.2. (a) except a dental, m and s in verbal or nominal endings. Cf. P. 1.3.4.
 Initial ñi ṭu ḍu. Cf. P 1.3.5
 Initial ṣ of a suffix (pratyaya). Cf. P. 1.3.6.
 Initial palatals and cerebrals of a suffix. Cf. P. 1.3.7
 Initial l, ś, and velars but not in a taddhita 'secondary' suffix. Cf. P. 1.3.8.

A few examples of elements that contain its are as follows:
 suP   nominal suffix
 Ś-IT
 Śi   strong case endings
 Ślu   elision
 ŚaP   active marker
 P-IT
 luP   elision
 āP   ā-stems
 CāP
 ṬāP
 ḌāP
 LyaP   (7.1.37)
 L-IT
 K-IT
 Ktvā
 luK   elision
 saN   Desiderative
 C-IT
 M-IT
 Ṅ-IT
 Ṅí   Causative
 Ṅii   ī-stems
 ṄīP
 ṄīN
 Ṅī'Ṣ
 tiṄ   verbal suffix
 lUṄ   Aorist
 lIṄ   Precative
 S-IT
 GHU   class of verbal stems (1.1.20)
 GHI   (1.4.7)

Auxiliary texts
Pāṇini's Aṣṭādhyāyī has three associated texts.

 The Śiva Sūtras are a brief but highly organised list of phonemes. 
 The Dhatupatha is a lexical list of verbal roots sorted by present class.
 The Ganapatha is a lexical list of nominal stems grouped by common properties.

Śiva Sūtras 

The Śiva Sūtras describe a phonemic notational system in the fourteen initial lines preceding the Aṣṭādhyāyī. The notational system introduces different clusters of phonemes that serve special roles in the morphology of Sanskrit, and are referred to throughout the text.  Each cluster, called a pratyāhāra, ends with a dummy sound called an anubandha (the so-called IT index), which acts as a symbolic referent for the list.  Within the main text, these clusters, referred through the anubandhas, are related to various grammatical functions.

Dhātupāṭha 
The Dhātupāṭha is a lexicon of Sanskrit verbal roots (dhātu) of classical Sanskrit, indicating their properties and meanings.  There are approximately 2300 roots in Dhātupāṭha. Of these, 522 roots are often used in classical Sanskrit.

Dhātupāṭha is organised by the ten present classes of Sanskrit, i.e. the roots are grouped by the form of their stem in the present tense.

The ten present classes of Sanskrit are:
  (root-full grade thematic presents)
  (root presents)
  (reduplicated presents)
  (ya thematic presents)
  (nu presents)
  (root-zero grade thematic presents)
  (n-infix presents)
  (no presents)
  (ni presents)
  (aya presents, causatives)

The small number of class 8 verbs are a secondary group derived from class 5 roots, and class 10 is a special case, in that any verb can form class 10 presents, then assuming causative meaning. The roots specifically listed as belonging to class 10 are those for which any other form has fallen out of use (causative deponents, so to speak).

Gaṇapāṭha 
The Gaṇapāṭha is a list of groups of primitive nominal stems (roots) used by the Aștâdhyāyī.

Examples of groups include:
 Listing of verbal prefixes (upasarga).
 Listing of pronouns ("pronoun" is not an accurate translation but is commonly used as the list includes 'he', 'she', 'it', but also 'all' (from which the group gets its name), 'that').

Commentary
It was with Patañjali that Indian linguistic science reached its definite form. The system thus established is extremely detailed as to śikṣā (phonology, including accent) and vyākaraṇa (morphology). Syntax is scarcely touched, but nirukta (etymology) is discussed, and these etymologies naturally lead to semantic explanations. People interpret his work to be a defence of Pāṇini, whose sūtras are elaborated meaningfully. He also attacks Kātyāyana rather severely. But the main contributions of Patañjali lies in the treatment of the principles of grammar enunciated by him.

Other information 
Pāṇini's work has been one of the important sources of cultural, religious, and geographical information about ancient India, with he himself being referred to as a Hindu scholar of grammar and linguistics. His work, for example, illustrates the word Vasudeva (4.3.98) as a proper noun in an honorific sense, that can equally mean a divine or an ordinary person. This has been interpreted by scholars as attesting the significance of god Vasudeva (Krishna) or the opposite. The concept of dharma is attested in his sutra 4.4.41 as, dharmam carati or "he observes dharma (duty, righteousness)" (cf. Taittiriya Upanishad 1.11).  Much social, geographical and historical information has been thus inferred from a close reading of Pāṇini's grammar.

Editions
Rama Nath Sharma, The Aṣṭādhyāyī of Pāṇini (6 Vols.), 2001, 
Otto Böhtlingk, Panini's Grammatik 1887, reprint 1998  
Katre, Sumitra M., Astadhyayi of Panini, Austin: University of Texas Press, 1987. Reprint Delhi: Motilal Banarsidass, 1989. 
Misra, Vidya Niwas, The Descriptive Technique of Panini, Mouton and Co., 1966.
Vasu, Srisa Chandra, The Ashṭádhyáyí of Páṇini. Translated into English, Indian Press, Allahabad, 1898.

Notes

Glossary

Traditional glossary and notes

Brahmic notes

References

Bibliography
 

 
 

 
 
 
 
 

4th-century BC manuscripts
4th century BC in India
Systems of formal logic
Grammar books
Indo-European grammars
Ancient Indian mathematical works
Sanskrit texts